Seath Andrew Holswich (born 6 June 1977) is a former Australian politician. He was a Liberal National Party member of the Legislative Assembly of Queensland for Pine Rivers from 2012 to 2015. He served as Assistant Minister for Natural Resources and Mines from May 2014 to January 2015. 

Following his parliamentary defeat after one term, he joined the Family First Party where he undertook the role of Queensland Campaign Manager for the 2016 Federal Election. He resigned his membership of Family First shortly after the election. 

In 2017 he ran as an independent candidate for Pine Rivers at the Queensland State Election.

References

Liberal National Party of Queensland politicians
1977 births
Living people
Members of the Queensland Legislative Assembly
21st-century Australian politicians